The ninth season of the television series Lud, Zbunjen, Normalan aired between November 3, 2015 and June 25, 2016 on Nova TV, TV Prva and TV B92. The season contained 24 episodes.

Cast

Episodes

References

External links

Lud, zbunjen, normalan
2015 Bosnia and Herzegovina television seasons
2016 Bosnia and Herzegovina television seasons